Twelve Dreams of Dr. Sardonicus is the fourth album by the American rock band Spirit. It was produced by David Briggs, who is best known for his work with Neil Young. The original LP was released in November 1970 by Epic. The band's lowest charting album to that point, it peaked at #63 on the Billboard 200 in February 1971, spending only fourteen weeks on the chart. However, it sold well as a catalog item and became the band's only album to ultimately attain a RIAA gold certification in the U.S., achieving that status in 1976.
On the Canadian RPM Magazine Top 100 charts, the album reached #49 and was in the top 100 for 10 weeks.

"Nature's Way" became one of Spirit's signature songs, but was not a big hit at the time, peaking at #111 on the Billboard pop charts in 1971. To capitalize on the album's enduring appeal, "Mr. Skin" (the B-side of "Nature's Way") was released as an A-side in 1973 and also charted, peaking at #92. It was voted number 332 in Colin Larkin's All Time Top 1000 Albums 3rd Edition (2000).

Despite these commercial limitations, Twelve Dreams of Dr. Sardonicus enjoyed significant airing on college FM radio. The album was re-issued on CD in 1988 by MFSL, without bonus tracks, and in 1996 by Sony in remastered form, with bonus tracks.

Reception
Writing in Rolling Stone, Nick Tosches opined that the album was a "blockbuster" despite some shortcomings.

Track listing

Personnel

Spirit
Jay Ferguson – vocals, percussion, keyboards
Randy California – guitars, vocals, bass
John Locke – keyboards, art direction
Mark Andes – bass, vocals
Ed Cassidy – drums, percussion

Additional personnel
Matt Andes – Dobro (on "Nothin' to Hide")

Production
David Briggs – Producer
Vic Anesini – Mastering
Adam Block – Project Director
David Blumberg – Horn Arrangements ("Mr. Skin", "Morning Will Come")
Ira Cohen – Photography
Jeff Smith – Package Design
Bob Irwin – Compilation Producer

Charts

See also
 Mr. Sardonicus, a 1961 horror film

References

External links
Album online on Radio3Net a radio channel of Romanian Radio Broadcasting Company

Spirit (band) albums
1970 albums
Epic Records albums
Legacy Recordings albums
Concept albums
Albums produced by David Briggs (producer)